Mwende Window Snyder (born 1975), better known as Window Snyder, is an American computer security expert. She has been a top security officer at Square, Inc., Apple, Fastly, Intel and Mozilla Corporation. She was also a Senior Security Strategist at Microsoft. She is co-author of Threat Modeling, a standard manual on application security.

Biography
Snyder is the daughter of an African-American father and a Kenyan-born mother, Wayua Muasa. She goes by her middle name Window; her first name is used only by family members. She graduated from Choate Rosemary Hall in 1993 and has served on their board. At college, she got a computer science major, and during that time got interested in cryptography and crypto-analysis and started actively working on the topic of cyber-security with the Boston hacker community in the 1990s, building her own tools and getting familiar with multi-user systems. She went by the nickname Rosie the Riveter in the hacker scene.

She then pursued this career path as one of the first computer scientists to specialize in cyber security, and to proactively try to bridge the gap between corporations and the security researchers often termed 'hackers'. Until 2002, Snyder was Director of Security Architecture at @stake. Subsequently, she worked as a senior security strategist at Microsoft in the Security Engineering and Communications group. During this time, she was a contributor to the Security Design Lifecycle (SDL) and co-developed a new methodology for threat modeling software, as well as acting as security lead and signoff on Microsoft Windows XP Service Pack 2 and Windows Server 2003. She also created the Blue Hat Microsoft Hacker Conference, an event bringing together engineers at Microsoft and hackers for a dialogue about the security of Microsoft's software. After leaving Microsoft in 2005, she worked as a principal, founder, and CTO at Matasano Security, a security services and product company later acquired by NCC Group. She joined Mozilla in September 2006.

On December 10, 2008, Snyder said that she would be leaving Mozilla Corporation at the end of the year. On March 1, 2010, Snyder began work at Apple Inc.

In 2015, Snyder became chief security officer at content distribution network Fastly.

Intel's Software and Services Group senior vice president and general manager, Doug Fisher, announced in July 2018 that Snyder would become the company's Platforms Security Division's chief security officer, vice president and general manager. She has since left Intel and in May 2019 joined Square, Inc.

On April 22, 2021, Snyder announced she had started a new company, Thistle Technologies, which describes itself as providing a "secure foundation for devices."

Works

Public appearances
Window Snyder has been appearing publicly to speak about challenges in computer security at several conferences and hackathons. In May 2017 Snyder spoke at Next Generation Threats, held by Techworld, IDG in Stockholm, Sweden. Earlier in April Snyder was a keynote speaker at HITBSecConf, held by Hack in the Box in Amsterdam. Later in November Snyder spoke at O'Reilly Security Conference. In April 2018 she spoke at RSA Conference, and in August 2018 Snyder was a keynote speaker at the Open Source Summit held by the Linux Foundation.

She has talked about career paths of women in cybersecurity, as for example in a keynote at the Women in Tech Symposium on March 6, 2020 on the UC Berkeley campus.

References

External links
dec.net (Snyder's blog)
Mozilla Security Blog - Window Snyder’s Blog
Window Snyder's photos (FlickR)
Security Developer Center: Threat Modeling (Microsoft.com)

Chief security officers
Living people
American people of Kenyan descent
Apple Inc. employees
Microsoft employees
Mozilla developers
Intel people
People associated with computer security
1975 births
Computer security specialists
African-American women engineers
American women engineers
African-American engineers
21st-century African-American people
21st-century African-American women
20th-century African-American people
20th-century African-American women